Endless Frontier: Vannevar Bush, Engineer of the American Century is a 1997 non-fiction book written by G. Pascal Zachary, published by The Free Press. It is a biography of Vannevar Bush.

Zachary described how the internet was preceded by the memex and rapid selector, things created by Bush.

Reception
Thomas P. Hughes of The New York Times wrote that the book "captured the spirit of Bush and his times" and that author was "Deeply informed and insightful". Zachary believed that Bush's views of giving supremacy to intellectuals and universities would not be tolerated by federal politicians in the 1990s and that, in Hughes's words, the author was "Zachary is impatient with Bush for resisting people whom he considered government interventionists".

Kirkus Reviews stated that the "biography demonstrates" how Bush is "a complex, deeply controversial, and profoundly influential figure."

References

External links
 Endless Frontier: Vannevar Bush, Engineer of the American Century at the Internet Archive

1997 non-fiction books
Books about the Manhattan Project
American biographies